Voljevac is a village in the municipality of Gornji Vakuf, Bosnia and Herzegovina.

Demographics 
According to the 2013 census, its population was 688.

References

Populated places in Gornji Vakuf-Uskoplje